Ralph Yelton (July 17, 1926 – February 8, 2015), was an American politician in the state of Tennessee. Yelton served in the Tennessee House of Representatives from 1977 to 1989 as a Democrat from Sullivan County, Tennessee. He was an accountant and in religion, a Baptist. He lived in Kingsport, Tennessee. He was a Korean War veteran, having served with the United States Army's 2nd Infantry Division. Yelton was wounded in 1951, leading to partial paralysis. According to Veteran's Administration records Yelton was the oldest living paralyzed combat veteran in the country. He died in 2015, aged 88.

References

1926 births
2015 deaths
People from Bakersville, North Carolina
People from Kingsport, Tennessee
Democratic Party members of the Tennessee House of Representatives